The Indonesia Warriors was an Indonesian professional basketball team that last competed in the ASEAN Basketball League (ABL).

Based in Jakarta, Indonesia, the Warriors replaced Satria Muda BritAma as Indonesia's representative in ABL.

On 19 January 2015, team general manager Rudolph Tulus, the commercial and corporate partnership director of Indonesia Sport Venture, the company that owns and manages the Warriors, announced that management had decided to pull the Warriors out of the 2015–16 ABL season in order to focus on its team (Satria Muda BritAma) in the domestic league. Rudolph Tulus also cited the team's poor results in the 2014 season and its responsibility to its sponsors as contributing factors to the decision. He said that management had not ruled out rejoining the ABL, but he could not be sure when that might be.

Roster

Notable players

 Youbel Sondakh
  Welyanson Situmorang
  Mario Wuysang
  Stanley Pringle
  Steve Thomas
  John Smith
  Richard Smith
  Chris Daniels
  Jerick Canada
  Francis Adriano
  Ricky Ricafuente
  Marlon Legaspi
  Nakiea Miller
  Achmad Adiyanto
  Swen De Ruijter
  Amin Prihantono
  Christian Ronaldo Sitepu
  Ronny Gunawan
  Cokorda Raka
  J.R. Aquino
  Ryan Febrian
  Fattah Arifin
  Allan Salangsang
  Arki Dikania Wisnu
  Doni Ristanto
  Frans Tjaswadi
  Evan Brock
  Jonathan Larry Smith
  Joey Mente
  Robert Sanz
  Marcus Morrison
  Ronald Capati
  Don Camaso
  Mark Magsumbol
  Alex Hartman
  Rensy Bajar
  Theo Little

Coaches
 Fictor Roring (2009–10)
 Ocky Tamtelahitu (2010–11)
  John Todd Purves (2012–13)
 Cokorda Raka Satrya Wibawa (2014)

References

Basketball teams in Indonesia
Basketball teams established in 2011